Aşurlu (also, Ashurlu and Ashurli) is a village and municipality in the Masally Rayon of Azerbaijan.  It has a population of 1,884.

References 

Populated places in Masally District